Clay Records was an independent record label founded by Mike Stone in 1980 and based in a record shop in Stoke-on-Trent, England.

History
Clay's first signing was local Stoke punk band Discharge who released the Realities of War single in April 1980. Stone distributed the single out of the boot of his car but it still made it into the top 10 of the indie chart in the music magazine Sounds. The label went on to sign artists including Play Dead, The Lurkers, Demon and G.B.H. Members of Clay went on to form Jungle Records in 1984.

In 1996, the label's distributor, Pinnacle Entertainment, went under, resulting in Mike Stone subsequently lost £25,000. This led him to close the label in 1996. In January 2000, the label's assets were sold off to Trojan Records, who was subsequently acquired by Sanctuary Records Group in 2001. Subsequently, Clay Records back catalogue is owned by Sanctuary/BMG Rights Management.

Discography
Releases by Clay Records were:

7"/12" Releases
CLAY 1 (1980) - Discharge: Realities of War 7-inch EP
CLAY 2 (1980) - Plastic Idols: Adventure 7-inch
CLAY 3 (1980) - Discharge: Fight Back 7-inch EP
CLAY 4 (1980) - Demon: Liar 7-inch
CLAY 5 (1980) - Discharge: Decontrol 7-inch EP
CLAY 6 (1981) - Discharge: Never Again 7-inch EP
CLAY 7 (1981) - Dave EDGE: then world 7-inch
CLAY 8 (1982) - GBH: No Survivors 7-inch EP
CLAY 9 (1982) - Zanti Misfitz: Kidz Songs 7-inch
CLAY 10 (1982) - White Door: Way of the World 7-inch
CLAY 11 (1982) - GBH: Sick Boy 7-inch EP
CLAY 12 (1982) - The Lurkers: This Dirty Town 7-inch
CLAY 13 (1982) - Zanti Misfitz: Love Ends at 8 7-inch
CLAY 14 (1982) - Discharge: State Violence State Control 7-inch
CLAY 15 (1982) - White Door: Kings of the Orient 7-inch/12"
CLAY 16 (1982) - GBH: Give Me Fire 7-inch
CLAY 17 (1982) - The Lurkers: Drag You Out 7-inch
CLAY 17P (1982) - The Lurkers: Drag you Out 7-inch pic disc
CLAY 18 (1982) - KILLJOYS: this is not love 7-inch
CLAY 19 (1982) - LOWLIFE: logic & lust 7-inch
CLAY 20	unreleased											
CLAY 21 (1983) - The Lurkers: Frankenstein Again 7-inch
CLAY 22 (1983) - GBH: Catch 23 7-inch
CLAY 23 (1983) - White Door: Love Breakdown 7-inch/12"
CLAY 24 (1983) - Abrasive Wheels: Jailhouse Rock 7-inch
CLAY 25 (1983) - Demon: The Plague 7-inch
CLAY 26 (1983) - White Door: Windows 7-inch
CLAY 27 (1983) - Sex Gang Children: Maurita Mayer 7-inch
CLAY 28 (1983) - Abrasive Wheels: Banner of Hope 7-inch
CLAY 29 (1983) - Discharge: The Price of Silence 7-inch
CLAY 30 (1983) - White Door: Jerusalem 7-inch
CLAY 31 (1984) - Play Dead: Break 7-inch/12"
CLAY 32 (1984) - The Lurkers: Let's Dance Again 7-inch
CLAY 33 (1984) - Abrasive Wheels: The Prisoner EP
CLAY 34 (1984) - Discharge: The More I See 7-inch/12"
CLAY 35 (1984) - Play Dead: Isobel 7-inch
CLAY 36 (1984) - GBH: Do What You Do 7-inch
CLAY 37 (1984) - White Door: Flame In My Heart 7-inch/12"
CLAY 39 (1984) - The Veil: Manikin 12-inch
CLAY 40 (1984) - Play Dead: Conspiracy 7-inch/12"
CLAY 41 (1985) - Demon: Wonderland 7-inch/12"
CLAY 42 (1985) - Play Dead: Sacrosanct 7-inch/12"
CLAY 43 (1985) - Discharge: Ignorance 7-inch/12"
CLAY 44 (1985) - Rebel Christening: Tribal Eye 12-inch
CLAY 45 (1985) - The Veil: Twist 7-inch

12" EP Releases
PLATE 1 (1981) - Product: Style Wars 12-inch
PLATE 2 (1981) - Discharge: Why 12-inch
PLATE 3 (1981) - GBH: Leather, Bristles, Studs and Acne 12-inch
PLATE 4 (1983) - Zanti Misfitz: Heroe's Are Go! 12-inch
PLATE 5 (1983) - Discharge: Warning 12-inch
PLATE 6 (1983) - English Dogs: Mad Punx and English Dogs 12-inch
PLATE 7 (1984) - The Lurkers: The Final Vinyl 12-inch
PLATE 8 (1986) - Demon: Sampler 12-inch

LP Releases
CLAY LP 1 (1979) - Grace: Grace LP
CLAY LP 2 (1981) - Grace: Grace Live LP
CLAY LP 3 (1982) - Discharge: Hear Nothing See Nothing Say Nothing LP
CLAY LP 4 (1982) - GBH: City Baby Attacked by Rats LP
CLAY LP 5 (1982) - GBH: Leather, Bristles, No Survivors and Sick Boys LP
CLAY LP 6 (1983) - Demon: The Plague LP
CLAY LP 7 (1983) - White Door: Windows LP
CLAY LP 8 (1983) - GBH: City Babys Revenge LP
CLAY LP 9 (1984) - Abrasive Wheels: Black Leather Girl LP
CLAY LP 10 (1984) - English Dogs: Invasion of the Porky Men LP
CLAY LP 11 (1984) - Play Dead: From the Promised Land LP
CLAY LP 12 (1984) - Discharge: Never Again LP
CLAY LP 14 (1984) - The Veil: Surrender
CLAY LP 15 (1985) - Demon: British Standard Approved LP
CLAY LP 16 (1985) - Play Dead: Into the Fire LP
CLAY LP 17 (1985) - They Only Come Out at Night Compilation LP
CLAY LP 18 (1985) - Demon: Heart of Our Times LP
CLAY LP 19 (1986) - Discharge: Grave New World LP
CLAY LP 20 (1986) - Play Dead: The Singles 1982-1985 LP
CLAY LP 21 (1986) - GBH: The Clay Years: 1981-1984 LP
CLAY LP 22 (1987) - Demon: The Unexpected Guest LP
CLAY LP 23 (1987) - Demon: Breakout LP
CLAY LP 24 (1987) - Discharge: 1980-1986 LP
CLAY LP 25 (1988) - Demon: Night of the Demon LP
CLAY LP 26 (1988) - Climax Blues Band: Drastic Steps LP
CLAY LP 105 (1990) - Driven To Death Compilation LP

See also
 List of record labels
 :Category:Albums produced by Mike "Clay" Stone

References 

Companies based in Stoke-on-Trent
Defunct record labels of the United Kingdom
British independent record labels
Punk record labels
Record labels established in 1980